Valery Georgiyevich Karpin (born 2 February 1969) is a football manager and former player who manages FC Rostov and the Russian national team. He is a former midfielder, primarily a right midfielder. Karpin is a citizen of Russia, Estonia  and Spain.

Club career
At club level, Karpin played for Fakel Voronezh (1989), Spartak Moscow (1990–94), Real Sociedad (1994–96 and 2002–05), Valencia CF (1996–97), and Celta Vigo (1997–2002). He retired at the end of the 2004–05 season with Real Sociedad.

International career
For the Russia national team, Karpin was capped 72 times, scoring 17 goals (he was also capped once for the CIS). He scored Russia's first goal after the breakup of the Soviet Union, in a 2–0 win against Mexico on 17 August 1992. Karpin played for Russia at the 1994 World Cup, Euro 1996, and the 2002 World Cup. In 2003, he won Cyprus International Football Tournaments when Russia beat Romania.

Managerial career
In August 2008, Karpin was named as Director General of Spartak Moscow, replacing Sergei Shavlo. In April 2009, following a poor run of results, he replaced Michael Laudrup as caretaker manager of the club. On 18 April 2011, Karpin declared resignation from his position following one of the worse starts in club history. Eventually, he continued working as a manager up to the end of 2011–12 season.

After the sacking of the newly appointed manager Unai Emery on 25 November 2012, Karpin took the responsibility of caretaker manager up until the end of the year. He later officially became the team's coach again and was not the caretaker anymore.

On 18 March 2014, Karpin was relieved from his duties, after exiting the Russian Cup to third division FC Tosno and drawing with top flight's bottom side FC Anzhi Makhachkala. On 12 August 2014, he was appointed at the helm of RCD Mallorca.

He joined FC Torpedo Armavir for the 2015–16 season after it was newly promoted to FNL. Under his management, the team (by then renamed to FC Armavir) was relegated back to the third-tier PFL, and on 23 June 2016, he left the club "by mutual consent".

On 19 December 2017, Karpin was announced as the new manager of FC Rostov on a two-and-a-half-year contract.

Russia National Team
On 23 July 2021, Russian Football Union hired him as manager of the Russia national football team until 31 December 2021 (for the duration of the World Cup qualification campaign). He was expected to continue coaching FC Rostov at the same time until that date. The contract has an option to be extended beyond that date. 10 days later, after just two games coaching both Rostov and national team, on 2 August 2021 he left Rostov by mutual consent.

Russia under Karpin qualified for the second round of World Cup qualifiers after finishing second in their group. However, on 28 February 2022, FIFA and UEFA suspended Russian clubs and national teams from international competition until further notice, due to the Russian invasion of Ukraine. On 10 March 2022, Karpin extended his contract with the national team until the end of 2022, and also returned to the manager position at FC Rostov. Russian Football Union president Aleksandr Dyukov clarified that Karpin would have to leave Rostov and focus on the national team job in case RFU's pending appeal of the disqualification to CAS is successful or disqualification is lifted otherwise. He was selected coach of the month by Russian Premier League for April 2022 and again for September 2022 and November 2022.

On 5 November 2022, Karpin extended his contract as the national team manager to 1 August 2024, with the suspension from international competitions still in place.

TV career
In 2016, he started working as analyst with Match TV. On 16 February 2017, he was appointed editor-in-chief of football broadcasts for the channel. He left the channel on 24 July 2017.

Personal life
Karpin has four daughters named Veronika (born in 1990), Maria (born 23 February 1996), Valeria (born 18 February 2001) and Daria (born 4 September 2018). Since 2017, Karpin is married to an English teacher, singer, and amateur skater Daria Gordeeva, the daughter of Katia Gordeeva (before that he was married twice). Since the dissolution of the Soviet Union in 1991, he acquired citizenship of Estonia, where has was born, as well as that of Russia, by descent. He later also received Spanish citizenship after playing in Spain for several years.

Retirement

In 2007 Karpin became the holder of road bicycle racing team Karpin–Galicia. He also owns a real estate company with former Celta Vigo team-mate Míchel Salgado.

In 2009, he was part of the Russia squad that won the 2009 Legends Cup.

Career statistics

Club

International

Managerial statistics

Honours
Spartak Moscow
 Russian Top League: 1992, 1993, 1994
 Soviet Cup: 1991–92

Celta
 UEFA Intertoto Cup: 2000
 Copa del Rey runner-up: 2000–01

Individual
Winner of the National Team Leader Prize: 2000

References

External links

 Valeri Karpin on the RSSSF-site
 All goals and career in Spain
 

1969 births
Living people
Association football midfielders
Soviet footballers
Russian footballers
Russia international footballers
Expatriate footballers in Spain
Russian expatriate sportspeople in Spain
PFC CSKA Moscow players
FC Fakel Voronezh players
FC Spartak Moscow players
Real Sociedad footballers
Valencia CF players
RC Celta de Vigo players
La Liga players
1994 FIFA World Cup players
2002 FIFA World Cup players
UEFA Euro 1996 players
Russian people of Estonian descent
Estonian people of Russian descent
Sportspeople from Narva
Russian expatriate footballers
Dual internationalists (football)
Russian Premier League players
Russian football managers
FC Spartak Moscow managers
Segunda División managers
RCD Mallorca managers
FC Rostov managers
Soviet Top League players
Soviet First League players
Russian Premier League managers
Russians in Estonia
Russian expatriate football managers
Expatriate football managers in Spain
People named in the Panama Papers
Russian association football commentators
Russia national football team managers
Naturalised citizens of Spain